is a railway station in Kokurakita-ku, Kitakyushu, Japan, operated by Kyūshū Railway Company (JR Kyushu).

Lines
Minami-Kokura Station is served by the Nippō Main Line.

Adjacent stations

See also
 List of railway stations in Japan

External links

  

Railway stations in Fukuoka Prefecture
Buildings and structures in Kitakyushu
Railway stations in Japan opened in 1944